The 1964 Campeonato Brasileiro Série A (officially the 1964 Taça Brasil) was the 6th edition of the Campeonato Brasileiro Série A. Santos Futebol Clube won its fourth title in a row, beating Clube de Regatas Flamengo in the finals.

Preliminary round

Northern Group

Northeastern Group

Northern Zone Finals

Southern Zone

Southern Group

Central Group

Southern Zone Finals

Quarterfinals

Semifinals
Palmeiras and Flamengo enter in this stage

Finals

References

External links 
 1964 Taça Brasil

Brazil
Campeonato
Taça Brasil seasons
B